The Estonian National Time Trial Championship is a time trial race that takes place inside the Estonian National Cycling Championship, and decides the best cyclist in this type of race. The first edition took place in 1997. The first race winner of the time trial championship was Urmo Fuchs in 1997. Jaan Kirsipuu holds the record for the most wins in the men's championship with 9, and the women's record is held by Liisi Rist with 7 wins. The current champions are husband and wife Rein Taaramäe and Hanna Taaramäe.

Multiple winners

Men

Women

Men

Elite

U23

Women

Elite

References

External links
Past winners on cyclingarchives.com

National road cycling championships
Cycle races in Estonia
Recurring sporting events established in 1997
1997 establishments in Estonia
Time